Couper is a surname. It may refer to:

 Archibald Scott Couper, scientist
 Heather Couper, British astronomer
 James Couper (disambiguation)
 Scott Couper, American football player 
 William Couper (bishop), 17th-century Scottish bishop and theologian
 William Couper (sculptor), 20th-century American sculptor
 William Couper (naturalist), 19th-century Canadian naturalist

See also
 Couper Islands, Nunavut, Canada
 Cooper (surname)

Surnames